The Deerfield Carbine or Model 99/44 is a .44 Magnum semi-automatic rifle produced by Sturm, Ruger & Co. It uses a rotating-bolt short-stroke gas-piston. It was introduced in 2000 and discontinued in 2006.
 
The Deerfield Carbine replaced the earlier Ruger Model 44 Deerstalker rifle first produced in 1961 and dropped from the Ruger lineup in 1985 due to high production cost. The Deerfield is a brand new design and has little in common with the Model 44. While the Model 44 featured a solid-topped receiver, the modern Deerfield Carbine has an open-top design more resembling the M1 Carbine, which is stronger and easier to make. The Deerfield also uses a rotary magazine similar to that used on Ruger's .22 LR 10/22 rifle, whereas the Model 44 was fed via a fixed 4-shot tubular magazine.

References

.44 Magnum firearms
Semi-automatic rifles of the United States
Short stroke piston firearms
Deerfieldug
Rotary magazine firearms
Carbines